Blodsvept (English: Shrouded in Blood) is the sixth studio album by Finnish folk metal band Finntroll. The album was released on March 22, 2013. The album features artwork by band member Samuli "Skrymer" Ponsimaa, including a painting for each song on the album.

Track listing

Personnel 

Finntroll
 Mathias "Vreth" Lillmåns – vocals
 Samuli "Skrymer" Ponsimaa – guitar
 Mikael "Routa" Karlbom – guitar
 Sami "Tundra" Uusitalo – bass
 Samu "Beast Dominator" Ruotsalainen – drums
 Henri "Trollhorn" Sorvali – keyboards, guitar
 Aleksi "Virta" Virta - keyboards
Jan "Katla" Jämsen – lyrics

References

2013 albums
Finntroll albums
Century Media Records albums